"Cry" is a song performed by British drum and bass duo Sigma featuring vocals from British pop group Take That (lead vocals by Gary Barlow). The song was released as a digital download on 20 May 2016, through 3 Beat Records. The song peaked at number 21 on the UK Singles Chart and is included on the deluxe edition of Take That's eighth studio album, Wonderland (2017).

Critical reception

Official Charts labelled the collaboration a "fists-in-the-sky anthem." Heat World stated that the track proved "the lads can still Take That & Party with the best of 'em."

Music video
A music video to accompany the release of "Cry" was first released onto YouTube on 28 May 2016 at a total length of three minutes and twenty-eight seconds. The full music video was filmed in and around the Arena Essex Raceway.

Track listing

Credits and personnel
Songwriting – Matt Furmidge, Dominic Joshua Alexander Liu, Sean Michael McDonagh, Chiara Hunter, Gary William Barlow, Mark Anthony Owen, Howard Paul Donald, Cameron James Edwards, Joseph Aluin Lenzie
Production – Cameron Edwards, Joseph Lenzie
Keyboards – Matt Furmidge, Dominic Joshua Alexander Liu
Strings – Rosie Danvers
Vocals – Gary Barlow, Mark Owen, Howard Donald

Credits adapted from liner notes.

Chart performance

Weekly charts

Certifications

Release history

References

2016 songs
2016 singles
Sigma songs
Take That songs
Songs written by Gary Barlow
Songs written by Mark Owen
Songs written by Howard Donald